Cole Deggs & the Lonesome was an American country music band founded in 2006 by Cole Deggs (lead vocals), Shade Deggs (bass guitar), David Wallace (lead guitar, vocals), Jimmy Wallace (keyboards), and Brian Hayes (drums). Cole and Shade Degges are brothers from Lake Jackson, Texas, David and Jimmy Wallace (who are also brothers) are from Shreveport, Louisiana, and Hayes is a Florida native. Before the band's foundation, Cole Degges co-wrote songs for other country artists, including an album track for Kenny Chesney, as well as Tracy Byrd's 2006 single "Cheapest Motel" and Andy Griggs' 2008 single "Tattoo Rose". He also wrote Gary Allan's 2013 single "It Ain't the Whiskey".

Cole Deggs & The Lonesome signed to Columbia Records Nashville in 2007, releasing their self-titled debut album that year. The first single, "I Got More," reached number 25 on the Billboard Hot Country Songs chart. After the second single, "Girl Next Door," failed to reach the Top 40, Cole Degges & The Lonesome were dropped by Columbia.

Discography

Albums

Singles

Music videos

References

Country music groups from Tennessee
Columbia Records artists
Musical groups established in 2006
Musical groups from Nashville, Tennessee
Musical groups disestablished in 2007
2006 establishments in Tennessee